Anatoli Vladimirovich Romanovich (born 9 September 1979) is a former Russian footballer.

External links

1979 births
Living people
People from Salihorsk
Russian footballers
FC Shinnik Yaroslavl players
FC Akhmat Grozny players
PFC Spartak Nalchik players
Russian Premier League players
FC Baltika Kaliningrad players
FC Krasnodar players
FC SKA-Khabarovsk players
FC Luch Vladivostok players
Association football defenders
FC MVD Rossii Moscow players
FC Dynamo Makhachkala players